Killeen Church is a medieval church and National Monument in County Meath, Ireland.

Location

History
Archaeological studies indicate that a church stood on the site in the 7th–9th centuries. No trace of it remains. A second phase of activity saw a ringwork constructed on the site, and a church at Killeen is listed in the ecclesiastical taxation (1302–06) of Pope Nicholas IV.

The current Killeen Church was built by Sir Christopher Plunkett (c. 1370 – c. 1445), a grandson of Sir Richard Plunkett, in the early 15th century. In 1403 Sir Christopher married Lady Joan de Cusack, daughter of Sir Lucas Cusack. In 1432 Sir Christopher Plunkett was appointed deputy to the lord lieutenant, John I Stanley of the Isle of Man, on his recall to England. A chantry was established by Sir Christopher and Lady Joan within the parish church in 1431. A badly-damaged fifteenth-century tomb in Killeen Church is probably their gravesite.

Killeen was until 1953 part of the holdings of the Earl of Fingall, and successive earls took care to preserve the church.

Church
The church is a nave and chancel structure. Visible features include a triple sedilia, hagioscope (squint), newel stairs, octagonal baptismal font and decorative carvings including coats of arms and mason's mark.

References

Churches in County Meath
Archaeological sites in County Meath
National Monuments in County Meath
Former churches in the Republic of Ireland